The ISPS Handa Senior Masters presented by the Stapleford Forum was a men's senior (over 50) professional golf tournament on the European Senior Tour. It was held in 2010 and 2011 at Stapleford Park, east of Melton Mowbray in Leicestershire, England. Bill Longmuir won in 2010 while Peter Fowler won in 2011. The 2010 event has prize money of £400,000 with the winner receiving £60,000, while the 2011 event has prize money of £200,000 with the winner receiving £30,000.

Winners

External links
Coverage on the European Senior Tour's official site

Former European Senior Tour events
Golf tournaments in England
Recurring sporting events established in 2010
Recurring sporting events disestablished in 2011